Arran Gaelic was a dialect of Scottish Gaelic spoken on the Isle of Arran, and was one of the last of the Southern Dialects to go Extinct.

Pronunciation

The Arran dialect falls firmly into the southern group of Gaelic dialects (referred to as the "peripheral" dialects in Celtic studies) and thus shows:
a glottal stop replacing an Old Irish hiatus, e.g. rathad 'road'  (normally )
the dropping of /h/ between vowels e.g. athair 'father'  (normally )
the preservation of a long l, n and r, e.g. fann 'weak'  (normally  with diphthongisation).
The most unusual feature of Arran Gaelic is the  glide after labials before a front vowel, e.g. math 'good'  (normally ).

History
Gaelic was still spoken widely on Arran at the beginning of the 20th century. The 1901 Census reported 25–49 per cent Gaelic speakers on the eastern side of the island and 50–74 per cent on the western side of the island. By 1921 the proportion for the whole island had dropped to less than 25 per cent. However, Nils Holmer quotes the Féillire (a Gaelic almanack) reporting 4,532 inhabitants on the island in 1931 with 605 Gaelic speakers, showing that Gaelic had declined to about 13 per cent of the population. It continued to decline until the last native speakers of Arran Gaelic died in the 1990s. Current Gaelic speakers on Arran originate from other areas in Scotland. In 2011, 2.0 per cent of Arran residents aged three and over could speak Gaelic.

Documentation
Arran Gaelic is reasonably well documented. Holmer carried out field work on the island in 1938, reporting Gaelic being spoken by "a fair number of old inhabitants". He interviewed 53 informants from various locations and his description of The Gaelic of Arran was published in 1957 and runs to 211 pages of phonological, grammatical and lexical information. The Survey of the Gaelic Dialects of Scotland, which collected Gaelic dialect data in Scotland between 1950 and 1963, also interviewed five native speakers of Arran Gaelic.

Mac an Tàilleir notes that the island has a poetic name Arainn nan Aighean Iomadh – "Arran of the many stags" and that a native of the island or Arainneach is also nicknamed a coinean mòr in Gaelic, meaning "big rabbit". Locally, Arainn was pronounced .

Extinction
The Scottish Gaelic dialect of Arran died out when the last speaker Donald Craig died in the 1970s. However, there is now a Gaelic House in Brodick, set up at the end of the 1990s. Brodick Castle features on the Royal Bank of Scotland £20 note and Lochranza Castle was used as the model for the castle in The Adventures of Tintin, volume seven, The Black Island.

References

Languages of the United Kingdom
Extinct languages of Europe
Scottish Gaelic dialects
Ayrshire
Extinct Celtic languages
Extinct languages of Scotland
Isle of Arran
Languages extinct in the 20th century